Peter Ikechukwu Anosike (born 24 December 1976) is a Nigerian former footballer who played as a striker.

Career

Club career

Anosike started his career with Belgian top flight side AA Gent, where he made 2 league appearances and scored 0 goals. On 21 October 1995, he debuted for AA Gent during a 0–3 loss to Anderlecht. In 1996, Anosike signed for Deinze in the Belgian second tier. In 1997, he signed for Australian club Perth Glory, where he scored a scissor kick on debut against West Adelaide. Before the 1999 season, Anosike signed for Hougang United in Singapore.

International career

He represented Nigeria at the 1993 FIFA U-17 World Championship, helping them win it and scoring the winning goal during the final against Ghana.

References

External links
 

1979 births
Association football forwards
Belgian Pro League players
Challenger Pro League players
Expatriate footballers in Belgium
Expatriate footballers in Singapore
Expatriate soccer players in Australia
Hougang United FC players
K.A.A. Gent players
K.M.S.K. Deinze players
Living people
National Soccer League (Australia) players
Nigeria youth international footballers
Nigerian expatriate footballers
Nigerian expatriate sportspeople in Australia
Nigerian expatriate sportspeople in Belgium
Nigerian footballers
Perth Glory FC players
Singapore Premier League players